Sørarnøy or Sør-Arnøy is a small fishing village in the municipality of Gildeskål in Nordland county, Norway.  The village covers the majority of the island of Sørarnøya.  The closest town to Sørarnøy is Bodø, to the north, which can be reached by boat.

References

Gildeskål
Villages in Nordland
Populated places of Arctic Norway